Sawrubandh is a village in Ballia, Uttar Pradesh, India. Sawrubandh is known for its significant contribution to the Indian independence movement. This village is famous for Hindu–Muslim unity, also called Ganga-Jamuni tehzeeb.

Villages in Ballia district